Volutospina is an extinct genus of fossil gastropod that lived from the Cretaceous to the Eocene in Africa, Asia, Europe, and North America.

References

Further reading 
 Fossils (Smithsonian Handbooks) by David Ward (Page 129)

Volutidae
Prehistoric mollusc genera
Cretaceous gastropods
Paleocene gastropods
Eocene gastropods
Prehistoric animals of Africa
Prehistoric animals of Asia
Prehistoric animals of Europe
Prehistoric gastropods of North America
Cretaceous genus first appearances
Maastrichtian genera
Danian genera
Selandian genera
Thanetian genera
Ypresian genera
Eocene genus extinctions
Fossil taxa described in 1906